The 2008 congressional elections in Maryland were held on November 4, 2008, to determine who would represent the state of Maryland in the United States House of Representatives, coinciding with the presidential election. Representatives are elected for two-year terms; those elected serve in the 111th Congress from January 3, 2009, until January 3, 2011.

Maryland has eight seats in the House, apportioned according to the 2000 United States Census. Its 2007–2008 congressional delegation consisted of six Democrats and two Republicans. Following the election, the delegation became seven Democrats and one Republican. District 1 was the only seat which changed party (from Republican to Democratic), and was the only district CQ Politics had forecast to be at some risk for the incumbent party.

Overview

District 1

The district encompasses the entire Eastern Shore of Maryland, as well as parts of Anne Arundel, Baltimore and Harford Counties, and was represented by Republican Wayne Gilchrest since 1991.

Incumbent Wayne Gilchrest, a Republican, lost to state senator Andy Harris in the Republican primary, in which E.J. Pipkin also ran. Gilchrest was one of only two Republicans to vote for the bill to set a timetable on the Iraq War, which passed, 218–212; he also voted on April 25, 2007, for another Democratic Iraq War bill, which passed, 218–208. Harris was first elected to the Maryland Senate in 1998 and served as Minority Whip, 2003–2006. He has worked as an anesthesiologist, an associate professor of anesthesiology and critical care medicine, and chief of obstetric anesthesiology at Johns Hopkins Hospital. Harris entered the February 12 primary with endorsements from the Club for Growth, former Governor Bob Ehrlich, seven of ten state senators who represent parts of the Congressional district, and House minority leader Anthony J. O'Donnell. Despite Gilchrest's endorsement by The Baltimore Sun, Harris defeated him by 10 points in a relatively bitter race.

Queen Anne's County State's Attorney Frank M. Kratovil, Jr., went into the February 12 primary as the Democratic frontrunner, with primary endorsement from The Baltimore Sun, governor Martin O'Malley, and Maryland comptroller Peter Franchot. Kratovil became Assistant State's Attorney in 1997, State's Attorney in 2003, and president of Maryland State's Attorney's Association, 2005–2007. He defeated his closest opponent, Cambridge lawyer Christopher Robinson, by nine points in a primary that was considered much more civil than on the Republican side.

While Harris had stated his belief that "the 1st Congressional District was drawn by Democrats to elect Republicans" and Gilchrest had carried the district for nine terms, Democratic leaders believed the district had "a moderate character" and was ready to support Kratovil competitively. In addition to targeting by the Democratic Congressional Campaign Committee, Gilchrest staffers held "Republicans for Kratovil" events. Gilchrest hinted early on that he would endorse Kratovil, being quoted as saying, "Let's see, the Republican Party, or my eternal soul?" and "Party loyalty, or integrity?" On April 17, 2008, an article in Politico announced that long-time Wayne Gilchrest campaign manager Lynn Caliguri, spouse of Gilchrest chief of staff Tony Caliguri, had joined the Kratovil campaign. In early September 2008, Gilchrest officially endorsed Kratovil.

District 2

The district comprises parts of Harford, Baltimore, and Anne Arundel Counties, as well as small portions of the City of Baltimore, and has been represented by Democrat Dutch Ruppersberger since 2003. Prior to serving in Congress, Ruppersberger was Baltimore County Executive from 1994 to 2002. Ruppersberger serves on the House Permanent Select Committee on Intelligence, the House Committee on Appropriations, and the Democratic Steering Committee.

The Republican candidate is Richard Matthews, a 28-year-old computer systems engineer from Orchard Beach, who is also the Anne Arundel County, Maryland organizer for the Ron Paul 2008 Presidential campaign. Matthews is a moderate Republican with libertarian political views on civil liberties and economic freedom. He opposes the Iraq War, and generally supports freedom of choice in both personal and economic matters.

District 3

The district comprises portions of Baltimore, Howard and Anne Arundel counties, as well as a significant part of the independent city of Baltimore, and has been represented by Democrat John Sarbanes since 2007.  Sarbanes faced off against Republican candidate Thomas Harris; in this staunchly liberal district, Harris faced little chance against the popular Sarbanes.

District 4

The district comprises portions of Prince George's and Montgomery Counties, and has been represented by Democrat Al Wynn since 1993.

Coming off a close primary against progressive advocate Donna Edwards in 2006, Wynn faced a competitive primary against her again in 2008. While Wynn made an effort to appear more progressive, he remains one of the most conservative members of the Congressional Black Caucus. This time, Edwards defeated Wynn in the primary. Wynn then announced he would be leaving Congress before his term's expiration in January 2009, which triggered a special election.

District 5

The district comprises all of Charles, St. Mary's, and Calvert Counties, as well as portions of Prince George's and Anne Arundel Counties.  The seat has been represented by Democrat and House Majority Leader Steny Hoyer since 1981. He was challenged by Collins Bailey, a businessman and fourth-term elected member of the Charles County Board of Education.

District 6

The district comprises all of Garrett, Allegany, Washington, Frederick and Carroll Counties, as well as portions of Montgomery, Baltimore, and Harford Counties, and has been represented by Republican Roscoe Bartlett since 1993.

Bartlett's district is one of the more Republican seats in heavily Democratic Maryland, and includes several western cities such as Frederick and Hagerstown. Bartlett was 82 as of June 3, 2008. While he still managed to receive 58% of the vote in 2006 against little-known Democratic opponent Andrew J. Duck, a stockbroker and U.S. Army veteran, it was nine points lower than his 2004 showing. Although there were early rumors that Bartlett would retire rather than run again, he subsequently filed his candidacy for re-election. Duck, too, ran again in 2008. In a surprise, former Cumberland Mayor Frank K. Nethken announced that he would be a candidate for the GOP nomination even if Bartlett sought re-election.

While Andrew Duck ran for the Democratic nomination, he lost to Jennifer Dougherty, the former Mayor of Frederick. Roscoe Bartlett won the Republican nomination.

District 7

The district encompasses parts of Baltimore City, Baltimore County, and Howard County, and has been represented by Democrat Elijah Cummings since 1996. Cummings did not face any opposition in the Democratic primary or general election in his last election, but faced Republican Michael Hargadon and Libertarian Ronald Owens-Bey, whom he easily defeated.

District 8

The district mostly consists of the larger part of Montgomery County, but also includes a small portion of Prince George's County, and has been represented by Democrat Chris Van Hollen since 2003.  Van Hollen has achieved national prominence as head of the Democratic Congressional Campaign Committee.

References

External links
Maryland State Board of Elections
U.S. Congress candidates for Maryland at Project Vote Smart
Maryland U.S. House Races from 2008 Race Tracker
Campaign contributions for Maryland congressional races from OpenSecrets

2008
Maryland
United States House of Representatives